The 1928–29 Polska Liga Hokejowa season was the third season of the Polska Liga Hokejowa, the top level of ice hockey in Poland. Six teams participated in the final round, and AZS Warszawa won the championship.

Final Tournament

External links
 Season on hockeyarchives.info

Polska Hokej Liga seasons
Polska
1928–29 in Polish ice hockey